Saroornagar is a suburb in Hyderabad. It is located in the Rangareddy district of Indian state of Telangana. It is located in Saroornagar mandal of Kandukur revenue division. This circle (5) comes under L. B. Nagar (East Zone) of Greater Hyderabad Municipal Corporation. There are five wards in this circle namely Saroornagar (19), Rama Krishna Puram (20), Kothapet (21), Chaitanyapuri (22) and Gaddiannaram (23).

History 
The Saroornagar Lake is a reservoir constructed in late 16th century during the Qutb Shahi era to provide water for irrigation of farm lands. This 400-year-old lake is spread across 1 sq. km area.

Asaf Jah II had given away a village beyond Malakpet as inam (gift) to Prime Minister Nawab Arastu Jah Bahadur’s wife Suroor Afza Bai. Arastu built a palace for his wife here and developed a huge garden around it. Since then the village came to be known as Saroornagar.

Saroornagar Palace was built both as a hunting lodge and as a summer resort by Mir Mahbub Ali Khan for himself and his family. The palace came up in 65 acres of land close to the Saroornagar Lake but was considered inauspicious for the Nizam, who then ordered it to be used as an orphanage. On the request of the then British Resident, it was dedicated to the memory of Queen Victoria. It is thus known as Victoria Memorial Home.

Geography 
It has an average elevation of 487 meters (1601 ft).

References 

Neighbourhoods in Hyderabad, India
Greater Hyderabad Municipal Corporation
Municipal wards of Hyderabad, India